Thien may refer to:

Thien Buddhism
Madeleine Thien, Canadian writer

See also 

 Thiên (disambiguation)
 Thiene
 Thoen (disambiguation)